Nicholas John Grunzweig Jr. (July 21, 1918 – February 10, 2007) was an American professional basketball player. He played for the Tri-Cities Blackhawks in the National Basketball League during the 1946–47 season and averaged 2.8 points per game.

Grunzweig served in the United States Army in both World War II and the Korean War, and spent the majority of his professional career in the military. After retirement from the military, he moved to Iowa where he worked for the Department of Human Services until retiring in 1979.

References

1918 births
2007 deaths
United States Army personnel of the Korean War
United States Army personnel of World War II
American men's basketball players
Basketball players from Buffalo, New York
Centers (basketball)
Forwards (basketball)
Niagara Purple Eagles men's basketball players
Tri-Cities Blackhawks players
University of Missouri–Kansas City alumni